UFS2 may refer to:

Unix File System
Universal Flash Storage v2.0